Puccinellia festuciformis is a species of grass.

Synonyms
 Atropis battandieri Speg.
 Atropis convoluta var. expansa (Crép.) Trab.
 Atropis convoluta var. tenuifolia (Boiss. & Reut.) Husn.
 Atropis distans var. festuciformis (Host) Coss. & Durieu
 Atropis festuciformis (Host) Schur
 Atropis festuciformis (Host) Richter
 Atropis festuciformis var. expansa (Crép.) Trab.
 Atropis palustris (Seenus) Beck
 Atropis palustris subsp. festuciformis (Host) Briq.
 Atropis palustris subsp. tenuifolia (Boiss. & Reut.) Jahan. & Maire
 Atropis rupestris Teyber
 Atropis tenuifolia (Boiss. & Reut.) K.Richt.
 Catabrosa festuciformis (Host) Link
 Festuca hostii Kunth
 Festuca palustris Seenus
 Glyceria convoluta subsp. festuciformis (Host) Douin
 Glyceria convoluta subsp. tenuifolia (Boiss. & Reut.) Douin
 Glyceria expansa Crép.
 Glyceria festuciformis (Host) Heynh. ex Rchb.
 Glyceria leptophylla Steud.
 Glyceria maritima var. palustris (Seenus) Fr.
 Glyceria palustris (Seenus) Lange
 Glyceria tenuifolia Boiss. & Reut.
 Phippsia palustris (Seenus) Á.Löve & D.Löve
 Poa festuciformis Host
 Poa halophila Schiede ex Steud.
 Poa mediterranea Chaub.
 Puccinellia battandieri (Speg.) Ponert
 Puccinellia caespitosa G.Monts. & J.M.Monts.
 Puccinellia distans var. fallax Maire
 Puccinellia distans subsp. festuciformis (Host) Maire & Weiller
 Puccinellia distans var. salina Fuss
 Puccinellia distans subsp. tenuifolia (Boiss. & Reut.) Maire & Weiller
 Puccinellia expansa (Crép.) Julià & J.M.Monts.
 Puccinellia festuciformis subsp. lagascana Julià & J.M.Monts.
 Puccinellia festuciformis subsp. tenuifolia (Boiss. & Reut.) W.E.Hughes
 Puccinellia palustris (Seenus) Grossh.
 Puccinellia palustris (Seen.) Podp.
 Puccinellia palustris subsp. festuciformis (Host) Maire
 Puccinellia stenophylla Kerguélen
 Puccinellia tenuifolia (Boiss. & Reut.) Andr.
 Puccinellia teyberi Hayek
 Sclerochloa festuciformis (Host) Britten & Rendle

References

 The Plant List entry
 Encyclopedia of Life entry
 JSTOR entry

festuciformis